Kaan Üner (born 1988) is a Turkish professional basketball player. He plays for Torku Selçuk Üniversitesi.

References

Turkish men's basketball players
Living people
1988 births
Place of birth missing (living people)
Date of birth missing (living people)
21st-century Turkish people